Paolo Bordogna  (born January 2, 1972) is an Italian operatic baritone and bass. He is particularly associated with buffo (comic) roles.

Biography
Bordogna studied singing with baritone Roberto Coviello. Since 2005, he has appeared often at the Rossini Opera Festival, Pesaro in such roles as Don Magnifico in La Cenerentola, Bartolo in The Barber of Seville and numerous others. His career has taken him to Teatro Real, La Scala, Bayerische Staatsoper, the Paris Opera, The Royal Opera and many others of the world's leading opera houses. He has also performed the roles of Dandini in La cenerentola and Figaro in The Barber of Seville. Over 50 roles in his wide repertory include the title role of Donizetti's Don Pasquale and Dr. Dulcamara in that composer's L'elisir d'amore.

In Mozart operas, he has performed as Figaro in Le nozze di Figaro at Opera Australia, Don Alfonso in Cosi fan Tutte at Teatro dell'Opera di Roma and Leperello in Don Giovanni for Staatsoper Wien.

In 2016, he was joined in a civil union with his partner Adalberto Ruggeri.

Selected discography 
Don Gregorio. DVD: Dynamic. Cat: 33579
La cambiale di matrimonio. DVD: Naxos Cat: 2110228
La gazza ladra. DVD: Dynamic, Cat: 33567
La Cenerentola. CD: Naxos Records Cat: 8.660191-92
Un giorno di regno. DVD (Blu-ray, PAL): Unitel Classica Cat: 720304
Tutti in maschera. DVD: Bongiovanni Cat:675754013264
Tutto buffo, solo album Decca records Cat: 4811685

Notes

External links
Official website

Living people
1972 births
Italian operatic baritones
Musicians from Lombardy
Italian LGBT singers
People from Melzo